Andre Jacquemetton is an American television writer and producer. He served as a producer for the first season of Mad Men. He and Maria Jacquemetton co-wrote three episodes of the first season. Alongside his colleagues on the writing staff, he won a Writers Guild of America Award for Best New Series and was nominated for the award for Best Dramatic Series at the February 2008 ceremony for his work on the season. He returned as a producer for the second season and continued to write episodes. He was nominated for the WGA award for Best Dramatic Series a second time at the February 2009 ceremony for his work on the second season. He won the WGA Award for Best Drama Series (after being nominated for the third consecutive year) at the February 2010 ceremony for his work on the third season.

He has been nominated for a Primetime Emmy Award for Outstanding Writing for a Drama Series for co-writing the episodes "Six Month Leave", "Blowing Smoke", and "Commissions and Fees".

Prior to Mad Men the Jacquemettons wrote for other series including Jack of All Trades, Relic Hunter, and Star Trek: Enterprise.

References

External links

American television producers
American television writers
American male television writers
Living people
Writers Guild of America Award winners
Place of birth missing (living people)
Year of birth missing (living people)